The Scottish Public Services Ombudsman Act 2002 is an Act of the Scottish Parliament which establishes an organisation for handling complaints about public services in Scotland. The Act makes provision for an officer, known as the Scottish Public Services Ombudsman, to be appointed and outlines functions to be exercised.

Duties established
This legislation was intended to create a modern complaints service. The Act established the ombudsman as a 'one-stop-shop', assuming statutory duties that had previously been the remit of three previous offices – the Scottish Parliamentary Ombudsman, the Health Service Ombudsman, the Local Government Ombudsman for Scotland. The Act also provides for the Ombusdman taking over non-statutory duties from the Housing Association Ombudsman for Scotland.

Consultation
In October 2000 the Scottish Executive published a consultation paper “Modernising the Complaints System” to stimulate debate on proposals to simplify complaints procedures and streamline the existing ombudsman system. In July 2001 a second consultation paper was published- “A Modern Complaints System”, which set out more detailed proposals relating to the work of public sector ombudsmen in Scotland, taking into account responses to the initial consultation.

Passage of the Act
The Bill for this Act of the Scottish Parliament was passed by the Parliament on 21 March 2002 and it received Royal Assent on 23 April 2002.

References

External links
latest available version of the Scottish Public Services Ombudsman Act 2002

Acts of the Scottish Parliament 2002
Scots law
Ombudsmen in Scotland